The 2016–17 Argentine Primera B Nacional was the 32nd season of the Argentine second division. The season began in August 2016 and ended in July 2017. Twenty-three teams competed in the league, twenty returning from the 2016 season, one team that was relegated from Primera División and two teams promoted from Federal A and B Metropolitana.

Competition format
The league's format changed from the previous season. Twenty-three teams which played each other twice for a total of forty-four matches each. The Champion and the runner-up earned promotion to the Primera División. Four teams were relegated at the end of the season.

Club information

League table

Results

Relegation
The bottom four teams of this table were relegated. In the Primera B Nacional, clubs with an indirect affiliation with Argentine Football Association are relegated to the Torneo Federal A, while clubs directly affiliated are relegated to Primera B Metropolitana.

Source: AFA

Season statistics

Top scorers

See also
 2016–17 Argentine Primera División
 2016–17 Torneo Federal A
 2015–16 Copa Argentina

References

External links
soccerway.com

Primera B Nacional seasons
2016–17 in Argentine football leagues